The Oxford Preservation Trust  was founded in 1927 to preserve the city of Oxford, England. The Trust seeks to enhance Oxford by encouraging thoughtful development and new design, while protecting historic buildings and green open spaces.

The Trust is a registered charity and is run by a board of trustees and an executive committee. It employs six staff including its Director, Debbie Dance.

The Trust runs Oxford Open Doors annually, as well as the OPT Awards (to encourage the best new buildings, conservation projects, landscaping and temporary projects), and it is a member of the Oxfordshire Blue Plaques Board.

Projects
The Trust's notable projects have included the successful conversion in the early 1990s of St George's Tower on the Oxford Castle site  into a popular  tourist attraction. It has also published reports advising on the redevelopment of parts of Oxford including Broad Street and the former site of the terminus of the Oxford Canal opposite the end of George Street.

The Trust has an ongoing role in preserving Oxford's green belt. To this end it owns several pieces of land at Boars Hill and elsewhere around Oxford such as Jarn Mound.  In 2007 and 2008 the Trust successfully opposed the Bodleian Library's proposal to build a new book depository that would have obstructed a view from Boar's Hill of Oxford's skyline that the poet Matthew Arnold (1822–1888) called the city's "dreaming spires".

Chairmen
During its history OPT has been chaired by a number of prominent academic and other figures. Several have chaired OPT at the same time as being vice-chancellor of the University of Oxford.
Herbert Fisher (1927–35)
Professor Sandie Lindsay (1935–38)
Professor G.S. Gordon (1939–41)
Sir David Ross (1941–44)
Sir Richard Livingstone (1944–47)
Dr. William Stallybrass (1947–49)
Very Rev. John Lowe (1949–51)
Sir Maurice Bowra (1951–54)
A.H. Smith (1955–56)
Rt. Hon. Lord Salter (1957–59)
William Harcourt, 2nd Viscount Harcourt (1959–79)
David Hennessy, 3rd Baron Windlesham (1979–89)
Professor Sir David Yardley (1989–2009)
Professor Roger Ainsworth (2009–2017)
Revd Professor William Whyte (2017– )

Secretaries
Some of OPT's Secretaries have also been prominent academic or other figures:
Miss H.E. Fitzrandolph (1936–45)
John Betjeman (1946–49)
Sam Smith, JP (1949–58)
Sir Douglas Veale (1958–62)
Ivan Lloyd-Phillips (1962–66)
R.W.S. Malcolm (1966–78)
Alderman Frank Pickstock (1978–82)
Mrs. Helen Turner (1982–90)
Mrs. Moyra Haynes (1990–98)
Mrs. Debbie Dance (1998– )

See also
Oxford Civic Society

References

External links
Oxford Preservation Trust website
Oxford Open Doors website

Organizations established in 1927
Culture in Oxford
Organisations based in Oxford
History of Oxford
Heritage organisations in England
Charities based in Oxfordshire
1927 establishments in England